Clair C. Dunn (May 17, 1915 – April 1, 1996) was an American football coach.  He served as the head football coach at the University of Toledo from 1951 to 1953, compiling a record of 9–12.  Dunn began the 1951 season as assistant coach at Toledo under head coach Don Greenwood.  When Greenwood resigned following a brawl in a game against Bowling Green, Dunn succeeded him on an acting basis.  Dunn's position as head coach was made permanent in January 1952.  He taught at Waite High School in Toledo, Ohio, where he was an assistant football coach.

Head coaching record

Notes

References

External links
 

1915 births
1996 deaths
Toledo Rockets football coaches
High school football coaches in Ohio
People from Ottawa County, Ohio
Sportspeople from Ohio